Kot pri Ribnici is a settlement west of the town of Ribnica in the Municipality of Ribnica in southern Slovenia. The area is part of the traditional region of Lower Carniola and is now included in the Southeast Slovenia Statistical Region.

Name
The name of the settlement was changed from Kot to Kot pri Ribnici in 1953.

Cultural heritage
There is a small chapel-shrine in the settlement. It dates to the 19th century.

References

External links

Kot pri Ribnici on Geopedia

Populated places in the Municipality of Ribnica